The Legislative Assembly election was held over five-phases in Bihar through October–November 2015 before the end of the tenure of the prior Legislative Assembly of Bihar on 29 November 2015.

In April 2015, the Janata Parivar group (a group of six parties – Samajwadi Party, Janata Dal (United), Rashtriya Janata Dal, Janata Dal (Secular), Indian National Lok Dal and Samajwadi Janata Party (Rashtriya)) announced their intention to fight the election, with Nitish Kumar as their Chief Ministerial candidate. The Janta Parivar was joined by the Indian National Congress and the Nationalist Congress Party. This coalition was restructured as Mahagatabandhan when the Samajwadi Party, Janata Dal (Secular), Indian National Lok Dal and Samajwadi Janata Party (Rashtriya) departed from the Janata Parivar.

The Bharatiya Janata Party led NDA fought the election alongside the Lok Janshakti Party, the Rashtriya Lok Samata Party and Hindustani Awam Morcha.

Six left parties fought jointly, independently from both of the two main blocs.

This election saw the highest voter turnout in Bihar assembly polls since 2000, with a 56.8% voter turnout in this election. The RJD emerged as a single largest party with 81 seats, followed by JD (U) with 70 seats and BJP with 53 seats. In terms of vote share, BJP came first with 24.4%, followed by RJD with 18.4% and JD (U) with 16.8% and Congress got 6.7%.

Background

Electoral process changes

Election Commission of India announced that around 1,000 Voter-verified paper audit trail (VVPAT) machines will be used along with EVM in 36 out of the 243 assembly seats in Bihar elections, spread over 38 districts. ECIL manufactured VVPATs will be used in 10 assembly constituencies, while BEL manufactured VVPAT will be used in 26 assembly constituencies. The election information was webcast for the first time and voters can locate their polling booth on phones via an app. About 1.5 crore voters would be informed about the voting dates via SMS.

Election Commission used three new software products – Suvidha, Samadhan and Sugam – to facilitate campaigning, public grievance redressal and vehicle management in Bihar. Electoral Roll Management Software helped in addition/deletion/upgradation of rolls. Android based app 'Matdan' helped the commission with poll-day monitoring in Bihar. Election Commission launched a special drive, Systematic Voters' Education And Electoral Participation (SVEEP) for voter awareness and higher voter turn out in Bihar elections. Bihar would be the first state to have photo electoral rolls, with photographs of candidates on EVMs.

Eleven NRI voters registered in the electoral rolls for the first time in Bihar electoral history. They were contacted by election officials through their family members. It was the first time that NRIs cast their votes semi-electronically from foreign countries. The e-postal ballot system and the existing proxy-voting facility is extended for NRI voters from their place of residence abroad. But this facility is not available to migrant voters within India.

A cross will be NOTA symbol to be used in this and subsequent elections. The Election Commission introduced the specific symbol for NOTA, a ballot paper with a black cross across it, on 18 September. The symbol is designed by the National Institute of Design, Ahmedabad.

On 31 July, the ECI published the final voters' list for the election, which has an overall population of 10,38,04,637, in accordance with the 2011 Census of India.

Security
The security used Unmanned Aerial Vehicles (UAV) drones, called Netras (eyes) for the election. The Election Commission of India decided that Bihar Police personnel would not be deployed at any of the 62,779 polling stations. They would be manned by members of the Central Armed Police Forces.

Bihar Legislative Council election
In July 2015, BJP-led NDA won 13 seats (including 1 independent backed by BJP) out of 24 seats of Bihar Legislative Council election. JDU and RJD combine won 10 seats only, while 1 seat was won by an independent candidate.

Central government actions
On 19 August, the central government notified 21 Bihar districts, including the capital Patna, as backward areas and unveiled tax rebates for them.  On 25 August, the central government released the religious data of the 2011 census. Hindus constituted 82.7% (8.6 crore people) in Bihar, while Muslims constituted 16.9% (1.7 crore peoples).

In July 2015, Jitan Ram Manjhi was accorded "Z"-plus security cover by the Union Home Ministry, while Pappu Yadav was accorded "Y" category security by government of India.

Other political developments
In May 2015, the JDU government increased the Dearness Allowance (DA) by six percent to 11 percent for provincial government employees and pensioners. In July, Nitish Kumar announced a 50 percent quota for OBC, EBC and SC/STs in all government contracts up to Rs 15 lakh. In July, the government issued a notification to give caste certificates to children from upper caste Hindu and Muslim families whose annual income was below .

In September, the government agreed to the creation of a dedicated fund for fencing off temples and the inclusion of two Extremely Backward Castes (EBCs), Nishad (Mallah) and Nonia, in the SC/ST category. The state government also decided  to provide grants-in-aid to 609 more madrassas across Bihar from the list of 2,459 registered by Bihar State Madrassa Education Board. The Bihar government gave a tax-exempt status to Manjhi – The Mountain Man, a film based on Dashrath Manjhi, a Dalit who carved a path through a 360 ft long, 30 ft wide and 25 ft high hillock in 22 years (1960–1982). Opposition parties accused Nitish Kumar government of doing nothing for Manjhi's village Gehlaur.

In April 2015, Nitish Kumar announced the JDU's decision to include few more castes, including the Teli, in list of Extremely Backward Class, which have 18% reservation in Bihar.

Caste and religion data
The 2011 national census indicated that Scheduled Castes constituted 16% of Bihar's 10.4 crores population. The census identified 21 of 23 Dalit sub-castes as Mahadalits. The Mahadalit community consists of the following sub-castes: Bantar, Bauri, Bhogta, Bhuiya, Chaupal, Dabgar, Dom (Dhangad), Ghasi, Halalkhor, Hari (Mehtar, Bhangi), Kanjar, Kurariar, Lalbegi, Musahar, Nat, Pan (Swasi), Rajwar, Turi, Dhobi, Chamar and Paswan (Dusadh). Among Dalits in Bihar, Chamars are the largest 31.3%, followed by Paswans (Dusadh) 30.9% and Musahars 13.9%. The Paswan caste was initially left out of the Mahadalit category, to the consternation of Ram Vilas Paswan. Chamars were included later in Mahadalit category. Adivasis (Scheduled Tribes) constituted around 1.3% of the Bihari population. They include the Gond, Santhal and Tharu communities. There are about 130 Extremely Backward Castes (EBCs) in Bihar.

Schedule
On 9 September,  Election Commission of India announced the dates for Bihar Assembly elections.

Parties and alliances

Mahagathbandhan

On 7 June, Lalu Prasad Yadav announced the RJD was joining in an alliance with the JDU for the election. On 13 July, he led a march demanding that the central government release its findings of the Socio Economic Caste Census 2011 (SECC) on caste, although Union Minister Ram Vilas Paswan pitched for a comprehensive classification of caste data of SECC 2011 before its release, and also said Lalu, Nitish will be worst impacted from the caste data even if its released. BJP Leader Sushil Kumar Modi called for rectification of errors in the cases of 1.46 crore people in India, including 1.75 lakh in Bihar, before releasing the caste data.

On 3 August, incumbent Chief Minister Nitish Kumar declared that he would not stand in the election. On 11 August, he announced the seat-sharing formula, according to which JD(U) and RJD will contest 100 seats each, while Congress will contest 40 seats in Bihar. NCP pulled out of this alliance later. On 23 September, Nitish Kumar announced the list of 242 candidates for the JDU–RJD–INC alliance. OBCs were most favoured in the alliance ticket distribution plan. 10% of tickets were allotted to women candidate by the alliance. The Congress Vice-president Rahul Gandhi assigned the task to shortlist Congress  candidates for each of the 40 assembly  constituencies to former Governor of Kerala and Nagaland Nikhil Kumar.

Nitish Kumar was the declared chief ministerial candidate for the Mahagathbandhan (Grand Alliance). Kumar started his Har Ghar Dastak (door-to-door) campaign on 2 July. Initially there were definite political overtures when both Lalu Prasad Yadav and Nitish Kumar shared stage together in a public  event commemorating former chief minister Satyendra Narain Sinha's birth anniversary that witnessed veiled attacks on each other, the last time  they did it in public.
Prashant Kishor was a key election strategist for the alliance. The Janata Dal-United started 400 audio-visual vans called Jan Bhagidari Manch raths for the campaign. Kumar is launching 'Bihar Samman Sammelan' in various cities, including Delhi and Mumbai, to connect with the Bihari diaspora.

However, the grand alliance broke on 26 July 2017 as a result of the resignation by Nitish Kumar and on the next day 27 July JD(U) made an alliance with NDA and Nitish Kumar sworn in as the chief minister of Bihar for the 6th time and Sushil Modi was sworn in as the deputy chief minister for the 3rd time.

National Democratic Alliance

Bhartiya Janata Party (BJP) used 243 GPS-monitored raths (modified Boleros) and video vans in the election. The BJP also set up a monitoring headquarters in Patna to track the movement of the GPS-equipped vehicles which will visit 40,000 villages in all 243 constituencies. The campaign was kick-started by Prime Minister Narendra Modi in Muzaffarpur on 25 July, where he also inaugurated the permanent campus of IIT Patna in Bihta. The BJP election exercise also involved three lakh volunteers. Modi held his second election rally in Gaya on 9 August and his third rally in Arrah and Saharsa on 18 August. Modi announced a Rs 1.25 lakh crore package for Bihar. He addressed his fourth rally in Bhagalpur on 1 September. Bollywood actor Ajay Devgan also campaigned for the BJP. Modi addressed several rallies after 25 October in several constituencies.

In a rally in Buxar on 26 October, Modi vowed to defend reservation of Dalits, STs, OBCs. He said of the Mahagathbandhan that it was trying to hatch a conspiracy to carve out a sub-quota on the basis of religion as the Supreme Court of India has said reservation cannot be more than 50%. On 27 October, in Bettiah, he again accused Nitish Kumar and Lalu Prasad Yadav of diluting the share of SC, ST and OBC. It promoted the view that an attempt was being made to take the reservation of Dalits and other OBCs and give it to other minorities. Union Finance Minister Arun Jaitley also agreed with Modi's assertions that the idea of reservations on the basis of religion is fraught with danger. On 1 November, Modi repeated the allegations that the two leaders came together in July 2005 to demand a review of the policy to provide for religion-based reservation. A video dating from 2005 which was leaked showed Lalu was asking for a quota for Muslims. On 3 July, BJP announced its seventh morcha, the BJP OBC Morcha, reportedly in regards to the election.

On 11 June, Jitan Ram Manjhi announced his party Hindustani Awam Morcha alliance with the NDA for the election.

On 14 September, the NDA announced its seat distribution: BJP got 160 seats, LJP got 40 seats, RLSP got 23 seats and HAM got 20 seats. The NDA did not announce any chief ministerial candidate. BJP announced the names of 154 candidates in three lists. Caste played a major role in distributing tickets. BJP also accommodated five candidates of the Hindustani Awam Morcha. Later, the BJP gave the Imamganj seat to HAM for Majhi is contesting and BJP reduced its seat tally to 159. On 1 October, the BJP released its manifesto.

Socialist Secular Morcha
On 19 September, the leaders of six parties – Samajwadi Party, Nationalist Congress Party, Jan Adhikar Party, Samras Samaj Party, National People's Party and Samajwadi Janata Dal Democratic – announced the formation of a third front known as the Socialist Secular Morcha. 
SP and NCP fought on most of the seats. NPP fought on 3 seats.
 On 15 October, NCP leader Tariq Anwar announced that his party had decided to leave the third front.

Left Front
On 24 July, the Communist Party of India, the Communist Party of India (Marxist), the Communist Party of India (Marxist-Leninist) Liberation, the All India Forward Bloc, the Socialist Unity Centre of India (Communist) and the Revolutionary Socialist Party decided to run in all constituencies on a join ticket citing its call for an alternative platform. The CPI will contest 98 seats, while the CPI-ML, CPI(M), SUCI, Forward Bloc, and RSP will contest 98, 43, 10, 9, and 3 seats, respectively. CPI released its first list of 81 candidates on 16 September 2015.

Others

Muslim parties
At least six Muslim parties contested the election. AIMIM contested six seats.

All India Majlis-e-Ittehadul Muslimeen (AIMIM) leader Asaduddin Owaisi addressed a rally in Kishanganj on 16 August. Owaisi accused Nitish and Lalu of keeping the Seemanchal region (consisting of 24 seats) as a backward region. AIMIM is contesting on 6 assembly seats in Seemanchal region where Muslim voters play a major role. He addressed a public rally in Kishanganj on 4 October in the Sontha village, which is part of the Kochadhaman Assembly constituency. He held further rallies at many places in Kishanganj and Purnia.

On 5 October, AIMIM released its first list of its six candidates for the election.

Bahujan Samaj Party
In June 2015, the Bahujan Samaj Party said it would contest all 243 seats. In July, the BSP initially released its first list of 49 candidates, including five women candidates, by Bharat Bind, the president of the BSP Bihar unit. National party leader Mayawati planned to campaign for its candidates. BSP's first list has 11 Other Backward Class (OBCs) and 11 Muslims, while they also field Dalits and OBCs from non-reserved seats. On 6 September, Mayawati said of the central government that it was being "remote-controlled" by the "communal and fascist" organisation  Rashtriya Swayamsevak Sangh (RSS).

Naseemuddin Siddiqui, Munquad Ali (Rajya Sabha MP), and Ram Achal Rajbhar were appointed to form a strategy to consolidate the Dalits, Most Backward Castes (MBCs), and Muslim votes. On 9 September, Mayawati questioned the announcement of Dearness Allowance (DA) by the central government just before the election and again accused the RSS and its affiliated Sangh Parivar organizations of using the 2011 national census for fear-mongering against Muslim population growth for sectarian purposes, as well as to divert attention from such issues as the alleged failure of the central government to deliver on its promises. She added that the census also showed positive signs such as the sex ratio among Muslims is 951 females to 1,000 males, which is higher than the national average and indicated a slowing of the Muslim population growth rate. On 10 September, she called for the deployment of central forces in large numbers on electoral duty to assure a free and fair election and further asked the ECI to keep a watch on possible sectarian ploys by the BJP.

Mayawati officially launched the party's campaign on 9 October from Banka. On 13 October, addressing a rally in Rohtas and Kaimur districts, she claimed that the SP chief Mulayam Singh Yadav and the party leadership had surrendered to the BJP. She claimed that it has fielded candidates after consulting with the BJP. She further called on the NDA to not allow the reservation policy for OBCs and SC/STs to fall under the RSS' influence.
On 25 October, Mayawati while addressing a rally in Buxar district of Bihar said that Samajwadi Party played in the hands of BJP due to which Nationalist Congress Party (NCP) broke away from it. She also alleged that BJP is working only for the Business class and the Nitish-Lalu governments did nothing for the poor.

Minor
Expelled RJD MP Pappu Yadav created the Jan Adhikar Party before the election and announced to fight against the Lalu-Nitish alliance. Yogendra Yadav has announced that Swaraj Abhiyan may extend its support to certain political parties, however it was not clear which one.

On 17 September, Shiv Sena announced that it will contest over 150 seats during the election. On 19 September, a third front – Socialist Secular Morcha – announced its seat distribution: SP got 85 seats, Janadhikar Party got 64 seats, NCP got 40 seats, SSP got 28 seats, SJP got 23 seats and NPP got three seats. Former U.K. banker Akshay Verma's Sarvajan Kalyan Loktantrik Party contested about 90 seats in the election.

The Aam Aadmi Party and JVM-P decided that they will not contest the election, but will campaign against the NDA.

Opinion polls

Election

The electorate in Chandila village of Maker block in Saran district's Amnour Assembly constituency boycotted the election and no votes were cast in protest against the government's failure to bring electricity to their village.

Exit polls
The Axis APM polls was not finally aired by its commissioning news channel, CNN–IBN.

Results
The result was announced on 8 November. The counting of EVMs of 14 assembly constituencies of Patna district was done in AN College Patna. The NOTA option had nine lakhs, or 2.5%, of popular votes and was the highest it had achieved in Bihar elections. The number of Yadav MLAs increased to 61 in the Bihar assembly.

Results showed that, of the 53 seats won by BJP, 27 were urban areas, which signified that BJP had dramatically shrunk back to its traditional urban support base in Bihar. BJP failed to make a big impact in the rural areas of Bihar, which has one of the lowest urbanization rates. Only 11.3% of the population of Bihar lives in urban areas, which is lowest in India after Himachal Pradesh.

According to one analysis, RJD was the biggest beneficiary of this election. RJD increased its seat tally by 59 compared with the previous election. RJD had the best strike rate by winning 81 of the 101 seats contested. RJD became the single largest party in Bihar Assembly. RJD defeated BJP in 36 seats BJP had won in the last election, similarly, it took 25 seats JD (U) had won in the last election.

Summary

|- style="background-color:#E9E9E9; text-align:center;"
! Colspan=2|Alliance
! Colspan=2|Political party 
! Votes 
! Vote % 
! Changein vote % 
! Vote % inSeats Contested
! Seats  Contested 
! Won 
! Net changein seats 
!  % of  Seats
|-
|rowspan=3 bgcolor=#008000|
|rowspan="3" style="text-align:center; |Mahagathbandhan
| 
| style="text-align:left;" |Rashtriya Janata Dal
| 6,995,509 
| 18.4 
| 0.44 
| 44.35
| 101 
| 80 
| 58
| 32.92
|-
| 
| style="text-align:left;" |Janata Dal (United) 
| 6,416,414 
| 16.8 
| 5.81 
| 40.65
| 101 
| 71 
| 44 
| 29.21
|- 
| 
| style="text-align:left;" |Indian National Congress
| 2,539,638 
| 6.7 
| 1.68 
| 39.49
| 41 
| 27 
| 23 
| 11.11 
|-style="background:blue; color: white;

|- 
|rowspan="4" style="text-align:center;background: orange; color: white;"|
|align=center rowspan=4|NDA
| 
| style="text-align:left;" |Bharatiya Janata Party
| 9,308,015
| 24.4
| 7.94
| 37.48
| 157
| 53
| 38
| 21.81 
|- 
| 
| style="text-align:left;" |Lok Janshakti Party
| 1,840,834
| 4.8
| 1.95
| 28.79
| 42
| 2
| 1
| 0.82 
|- 
| 
| style="text-align:left;" |Rashtriya Lok Samata Party
| 976,787 
| 2.6 
| -
| 0.64
| 23 
| 2 
| 2 
| 0.82 
|- 
|bgcolor=#FF0000|
| style="text-align:left;" |Hindustani Awam Morcha
| 864,856 
| 2.3 
| -
| 26.90
| 21 
| 1 
| 1 
| 0.41 
|-style="background:orange; color: white;

|- 
|rowspan=6 bgcolor=#FF0000|
|rowspan="6" style="text-align:center;|Left Front
| 
| style="text-align:left;" |Communist Party of India
| 516,699
| 1.36
| 0.29
| 3.43
| 98
| 0
| 1
| 0 
|-
| 
| style="text-align:left;" |CPI(ML) Liberation
| 587,701
| 1.54
| 0.29
| 3.82
| 98
| 3
| 3
| 1.23 
|-
| 
| style="text-align:left;" |Communist Party of India (Marxist)
| 232,149
| 0.61
| 0.21
| 3.32
| 43
| 0
| 
| 0  
|-
| 
| style="text-align:left;" |Socialist Unity Centre of India (Communist)
| 11,621
| 0.03
| 0.02
| 0.74
| 10
| 0
| 
| 0  
|-
| 
| style="text-align:left;" |All India Forward Bloc
| 6,936
| 0.02
| 0.00
| 0.21
| 9
| 0
| 
| 0  
|-
| 
| style="text-align:left;" |Revolutionary Socialist Party
| 3,045
| 0.01
| 0.00
| 0.64
| 3
| 0
| 
| 0  
|-
|rowspan=6|
|rowspan="6" style="text-align:center;"| Socialist  Secular  Morcha
| 
| style="text-align:left;" |Samajwadi Party
| 385,511
| 1.0
| 0.45
| 1.83
| 85
| 0
| 
| 0  
|- 
| 
| style="text-align:left;" | Jan Adhikar Party (Loktantrik)
| 514,748
| 1.4
| 
| 
| 64
| 0
| 
| 0  
|- 
|- 
| 
| style="text-align:left;" |Nationalist Congress Party
| 185,437
| 0.5
| 1.32
| 2.82
| 40
| 0
| 
| 0  
|- 
| 
| style="text-align:left;" | Samras Samaj Party
| 
| 
| 
| 
| 28
| 0
| 
| 0 
|- 
|bgcolor=#008000|
| style="text-align:left;" | Samajwadi Janata Dal Democratic
| 
| 
| 
| 
| 23
| 0
| 
| 0  
|- 
|bgcolor=#DB7093|
| style="text-align:left;" |National People's Party
| 
| 
| 
| 
| 3
| 0
| 
| 0 
|-
|rowspan=7|
|rowspan="7" style="text-align:center;"| Others
| 
| style="text-align:left;" |Bahujan Samaj Party
| 788,024
| 2.1
| 1.11
| 2.21
| 243 
| 0
| 
| 0  
|-
| 
| style="text-align:left;" |Shiv Sena
| 211,131 
| 0.6 
| 0.21 
| 1.84
| 150 
| 0 
|  
| 0 
|- 
| 
| style="text-align:left;" |Sarvajan Kalyan Loktantrik Party
| 108,851
| 0.3
| 
| 0.91
| 90
| 0
| 
| 0  
|- 
| 
| style="text-align:left;" |Jharkhand Mukti Morcha 
| 103,940
| 0.3
| 0.31
| 2.02
| 
| 0
| 
| 0 
|- 
| 
| style="text-align:left;" |Garib Janata Dal (Secular) 
| 92,279
| 0.2
| 
| 0.66
| 
| 0
| 
| 0 
|-
| 
| style="text-align:left;" |All India Majlis-e-Ittehadul Muslimeen
| 80,248
| 0.2
| 
| 8.04
| 6
| 0
| 
| 0 
|-
| 
| style="text-align:left;" |Independents
| 3,580,953
| 9.4
| 3.82
| 9.57
| 1150
| 4
| 2
| 1.64 
|-
|Colspan=1|
|
| 
| style="text-align:left;colspan = 4|NOTA
| 947,276 
| 2.5 
|  
| 2.49
| 243 
|  
|  
|  
|-
|- class="unsortable" style="background-color:#E9E9E9"
! colspan = 3|Total
! 37,673,594
! style="text-align:center;" |100.00
! colspan = 1|
!
! style="text-align:center;" |243
!
!
! 
!
|-
! colspan="12" |
|-
| style="text-align:right;" colspan="3" |Valid votes
|37,673,594
|99.94
| colspan="7" rowspan="5" style="background-color:#E9E9E9"  |
|-
| style="text-align:right;" colspan="3" |Invalid votes
|23,384
|0.06
|-
| style="text-align:right;" colspan="3" |Votes cast / turnout
|37,673,594
|56.91
|-
| style="text-align:right;" colspan="3" |Abstentions
| 2,85,46,215
|43.09
|-
| style="text-align:right;" colspan="3" |Registered voters
| 6,62,43,193
|colspan="1" style="background-color:#E9E9E9"|
|-
|}

Results by District

Results by constituency

MLA Statistics

 1 in every 4 new members in Bihar Assembly is a Yadav
 Elected MLAs caste-wise-2015
 ಬಿಹಾರದ ಶಾಸಕರಲ್ಲಿ ಯಾದವರು ಶೇ 25ರಷುı!

Government formation
Janata Dal (United) leader Nitish Kumar was sworn in as chief minister for the fifth time on 20 November 2015 after the Mahagathbandhan alliance won a sweeping victory, taking 178 seats. The two sons of RJD chief Lalu Prasad, Tejaswi and Tej Pratap were also sworn in as ministers. Tejaswi Yadav became Deputy Chief Minister. Apart from Nitish Kumar, 12 members each from the Janata Dal (United) and the Rashtriya Janata Dal and four from the Congress were administered the oath of office as ministers.

On 26 July 2017, the Grand Alliance broke and a new coalition government between JD(U) and the BJP was formed.

Voting analysis 
A phase-wise analysis of the polling percentages puts the fifth and final phase on the top with a 60% turnout. The polling in this round beats the 58.5% turnout recorded in the fourth phase, as also 53.7% voting in the third phase, 55.5% in the second, and 55.8% in the first phase.
 2015 – 56.9%; 2010 – 52.7%; 2005 – 45.9%; 2000 – 62.6% (Assembly Polls were held twice in 2005 due to a fractured verdict.)

See also
 2015 elections in India
 List of Assembly constituencies of Bihar
 Chief Ministers of Bihar
 2017 Uttar Pradesh Legislative Assembly election
 Fifth Nitish Kumar ministry
 Sixth Nitish Kumar ministry

References

External links
 Bihar Lok Sabha Election 2019 Results Website
 Election Commission of India – Bihar 2015
 Detailed results – Election Commission of India, State Elections, 2015 Legislative Assembly of Bihar

2015
2015
Bihar